İvedik is a neighbourhood in the Yenimahalle district of Ankara Province, Turkey. İvedik Street is the main road in the neighbourhood. It is bordered by Yakacık, Yuva and Karşıyaka neighbourhoods within the same district. The district gardens were once famous for their watermelon production, though it is now an urban area.

The largest cemetery within the metropolitan city limits of Ankara, the Karşıyaka Cemetery is situated in İvedik.

References

External links
 
 Map of İvedik neighbourhood
 District map of Yenimahalle, Ankara 

Populated places in Ankara Province
Neighbourhoods of Yenimahalle, Ankara